Fanny was an American rock band, active in the early to mid 1970s. They were one of the first all-female rock groups to achieve critical and commercial success, including two Billboard Hot 100 Top 40 singles.

The group was founded by guitarist June Millington and her sister, bassist Jean, who had been playing music together since they moved from the Philippines to California in the early 1960s. After playing through several variations of the band, they attracted the interest of producer Richard Perry who signed them to Reprise Records in 1969 as Fanny. The band recorded four albums together before June Millington quit the group, leading to the original line-up splitting. Following a final album, Fanny disbanded in 1975. The Millington sisters have continued to play music together since the split, and with a former drummer, Brie Howard-Darling, formed the spin-off group Fanny Walked the Earth in 2018.

The group has continued to attract critical acclaim for rejecting typical girl group styles and expectations of women in the rock industry generally, and emphasizing their musical skills. Later groups such as the Go-Go's, the Bangles, and the Runaways cited Fanny as a key influence.

Career
Sisters June and Jean Millington moved with their family from the Philippines to Sacramento, California in 1961. They began to play music together on ukuleles, which helped them gain friends. In high school they formed an all-female band called the Svelts with June on guitar, Jean on bass, Addie Lee on guitar, and Brie Brandt on drums. Brandt left to get married and was later replaced by Alice de Buhr.

Lee and de Buhr later formed another all-female band, Wild Honey. The Millington sisters later joined this band as well. Wild Honey played Motown covers and eventually moved to Los Angeles. Frustrated by a lack of success or respect in the male-dominated rock scene, Wild Honey decided to disband after one final open-mic appearance at the Troubadour Club in Los Angeles in 1969. They were spotted at this gig by the secretary of producer Richard Perry, who had been searching for an all-female rock band to mentor.

Perry convinced Warner Bros. Records to sign the band, still known as Wild Honey, to Reprise Records. The group won the contract without the label hearing them play, on the grounds of being a novelty act, despite their genuine musical talent. Warner Bros. installed the band in a rented mansion formerly owned by Hedy Lamar, on Marmont Lane near Sunset Boulevard. Prior to recording their first album, the band recruited keyboardist Nickey Barclay while bringing in early Svelts member Brandi Brandt.

The band was then renamed Fanny, not with a sexual connotation but to denote a female spirit. The initial lineup consisted of June Millington on guitar, Jean Millington on bass, de Buhr on drums, Barclay on keyboards, and Brandt on lead vocals and percussion. Perry dismissed Brandt because he wanted the group to be a self-contained four-piece band like the Beatles. The Millingtons and Barclay all assumed lead vocal duties on alternating songs, while de Buhr sang lead occasionally on later albums.

Perry produced the band's first three albums, beginning with Fanny in 1970. Because of the connection to Perry and Reprise Records, Barclay was invited to tour with Joe Cocker as a backing singer, and consequently appeared on the album Mad Dogs and Englishmen. The group's cover of Cream's "Badge" from the first album earned significant radio airplay. The follow-up album, Charity Ball was released the following year, and its title track reached #40 on the Billboard Hot 100. The members of Fanny also worked as session musicians, and played on Barbra Streisand's 1971 album Barbra Joan Streisand, after Streisand had wanted to record with a small band.

The group continued to pick up well-known fans; David Bowie sent the group a letter admiring their work and invited the band to a post-show party where he showed them mime techniques. With young engineer Leslie Ann Jones as their road manager and live sound mixer, Fanny toured worldwide, opening for Slade, Jethro Tull and Humble Pie, gaining widespread popularity in the United Kingdom. A 1971 article in Sounds remarked that the group "seems that they are the support group to everyone these days". The group made several live television appearances during tours, including The Sonny and Cher Show, American Bandstand, The Old Grey Whistle Test and Beat-Club.

The group's third album, Fanny Hill (1972) featured the Beatles' engineer Geoff Emerick in addition to Perry's production. It included covers of the Beatles' "Hey Bulldog" and Marvin Gaye's "Ain't That Peculiar". The latter featured regular Rolling Stones saxophonist Bobby Keys, and was released as a single, reaching #85 on the Billboard Hot 100. Fellow Stones sideman Jim Price also played brass on the album. Rolling Stone wrote a rave review of the album, praising the group's musical skills and particularly June Millington's ability to play both lead and rhythm guitar.

Their fourth album, Mothers Pride (1973), was produced by Todd Rundgren. By the time Mothers Pride was released, June Millington was feeling constrained by the group format. The record label wanted her to wear certain designer clothes and adopt a hard rock image, which she resisted. She decided to quit the group, later saying "I needed to figure out who I was" and regularly clashed with Barclay due to conflicting personalities. June moved to Woodstock to study Buddhism, but insisted that the group continue without her.

De Buhr also left the band, with a returning Brandt replacing her on drums. Patti Quatro (sister of Suzi Quatro) replaced June on guitar. This lineup signed with Casablanca Records and released the final Fanny album, Rock and Roll Survivors, in 1974. The first single, "I've Had It" reached #79 on the Billboard Hot 100.  Brandt left the band shortly after the album's completion when she married composer James Newton Howard, and was briefly replaced by Cam Davis. Barclay quit the group at the end of 1974, thinking it was not working without June Millington. The second single, "Butter Boy" was written by Jean Millington about Bowie, and became their biggest hit, reaching #29 on the Billboard Hot 100 in April 1975. By the time that single was released, the group had split.

Post-split activities
After the breakup, in 1975 the Millington sisters put together a new line-up of Fanny for a short tour, though no older Fanny material was played. This group ultimately morphed into a new all-women band called the L.A. All-Stars, which generated some interest from record labels, but with the stipulation that the band tour as Fanny and play only old Fanny songs, which June Millington opposed.

June Millington subsequently released three solo albums in the 1980s and has had a career as a producer for artists including Holly Near, Cris Williamson and Bitch and Animal. She operates the Institute for Musical Arts, a non-profit organization supporting girls and women in music. Jean Millington was married to Bowie's guitarist Earl Slick for a time and later became an herbalist. The Millingtons continued to record together after Fanny as well, most recently on the 2011 album Play Like a Girl on June's label Fabulous Records. Nickey Barclay released a solo album titled Diamond in a Junkyard in 1976 then withdrew from the music industry. De Buhr later worked in marketing for several major record labels, and promoted the Go-Go's, who cited Fanny as an influence. She collaborated with Real Gone Music in a reissue program for the group's albums.

Patti Quatro continued to work as a session musician for her sister Suzi and was involved in the reissue of material by the Quatro sisters' early band the Pleasure Seekers. Brie Brandt, later known as Brie Howard-Darling and currently as Brie Darling, had an active post-Fanny career, fronting the bands American Girls, which released one album in 1986, and Boxing Gandhis, which has released four albums since the mid-1990s. She has also acted in films such as 1982's Android and is the mother of Playboy Playmate Brandi Brandt. Quatro and Brandt both toured with Electric Light Orchestra and appeared on the album A New World Record in 1976.

In 2002, Rhino Records released the limited edition 4-CD box set First Time in a Long Time, which collected Fanny's first four studio albums along with live recordings, outtakes, and promotional items. A reunion concert featuring the Millington sisters and de Buhr (Barclay declined to appear for health reasons) was held at Berklee College of Music on April 20, 2007, where the band members received the ROCKRGRL Women of Valor award for their achievements. The first four original Fanny albums are available on Real Gone records, with updated liner notes, pictures, and new mixes.

In 2016, Brie Howard joined a live performance by the Millington sisters. This inspired the formation of a new band called Fanny Walked the Earth. An album also titled Fanny Walked the Earth  was released in March 2018. The album marks the first time June, Jean, and Brie all recorded at the same time in nearly 50 years. Fanny is the subject of the documentary film Fanny: The Right to Rock, released in 2021 and directed by Bobbi Jo Hart.

Musical style and legacy
Though Fanny was not the first all-female rock band to sign with a major label (after Goldie & the Gingerbreads and the Pleasure Seekers), they were the first to release an album on a major label and one of the first to achieve top 40 success on the Billboard Hot 100. Fanny's music was influenced by the Beatles and the Funk Brothers, the loose studio musician collective on Motown records.

The band resisted suggestions by the record company to dress in a typical girl group style, or emphasise any sex appeal, and rehearsed regularly, wanting to acquire a reputation based on their musical talent. Jean Millington later said that Fanny had to have a strong live presence in order to overcome audience's perceptions that women could not play rock music well. June added, "We knew we had to prove we could play and deliver live. Otherwise, no one would believe it." The group were more successful in the UK and Europe, where audiences appreciated their music and respected their work, as opposed to the US. De Buhr was disappointed to discover that some record company executives merely treated Fanny as a gimmick that should not be taken seriously. Promoter Bill Graham was reluctant to give the group a headlining slot at venues, for fear the group would split up as the members got married and had children, though the group have stressed this was due to business pragmatics and not chauvinism. During tours, female fans would ask the group how to form a band. Later all-female bands such as the Runaways and the Bangles have cited Fanny as a key influence.

A retrospective review of the group's career in Rebeat stressed that Fanny were simply a good band, irrespective of gender. June Millington has been praised for her guitar skills, and was described by Guitar Player as the hottest female guitar player in the music industry. During her time in Fanny, she initially favored the Gibson ES-355 and Fender Twin Reverb amp, before acquiring a Gibson Les Paul Junior guitar and Traynor amplifiers. She used the Les Paul primarily for slide guitar playing. Jean Millington's main instrument in Fanny was a 1963 Fender Precision Bass, which is still in her possession.

Little Feat bandleader Lowell George was a fan of Fanny and jammed with the group when they were in Los Angeles. In a 1999 interview with Rolling Stone, Bowie revealed his respect for the band:

Personnel

Original line-up
 Jean Millington – bass, vocals 
 June Millington – guitar, vocals 
 Nickey Barclay – keyboards, vocals 
 Alice de Buhr – drums, vocals

Later members
 Patti Quatro – guitar, vocals 
 Brie Howard – drums, vocals 
 Cam Davis – drums

Discography
Studio albums
 Fanny (1970)
 Charity Ball (1971) (No. 150)
 Fanny Hill (1972) (No. 135)
 Mothers Pride (1973)
 Rock and Roll Survivors (1974)
Live albums
 Fanny Live (1998; recorded 1972) 
Compilation albums
 First Time in a Long Time - The Reprise Recordings (4-CD box set, 2002)
Fanny Walked the Earth
 Fanny Walked the Earth (2018)

See also
List of all-female bands
List of guests appearing on The Midnight Special
List of sibling musical groups

References
Citations

Sources

External links

Kickstarter Project: Play Like A Girl
Fan forum and portal: Fanny Seven Roads (F7R)
Metalmaidens' general history on the band
NY Daily News article on new album Play Like a Girl

 
All-female bands
Musical groups established in 1969
Musical groups disestablished in 1975
Musical groups from Los Angeles